The 500 meters distance for men in the 2014–15 ISU Speed Skating World Cup was contested over 12 races on six occasions, out of a total of seven World Cup occasions for the season, with the first occasion taking place in Obihiro, Japan, on 14–16 November 2014, and the final occasion taking place in Erfurt, Germany, on 21–22 March 2015.

The defending champion was Ronald Mulder of the Netherlands. Pavel Kulizhnikov of Russia won the cup. Mulder did not participate this season.

Top three

Race medallists

Standings 
Standings as of 22 March 2015 (end of the season).

References 

 
Men 0500